The National Logistics Cell (NLC) is a Pakistani logistics company run by the Pakistan Army. It is one of the largest logistics company in Pakistan.

The NLC served as a sole purpose of crises management and logistics emergence on a short notice for the Pakistan Government. The NLC provide state-emergency level management services to the government, and is one of leading crises management government authority in the country. Its Director General is Major General Farrukh Shahzad Rao.

History
National Logistics Cell was founded by Muhammad Zia-ul-Haq regime to supply military equipment to Mujahideens fighting Soviet Union. Later, it was given the freight business of Pakistan Railways by the regime.

Controversies

References

Pakistan Army affiliated organizations
Logistics companies of Pakistan
N
Military logistics of Pakistan
Companies based in Rawalpindi
Government-owned companies of Pakistan